Mahonia microphylla is a shrub in the Berberidaceae first described as a species in 1999. It is endemic to Guangxi Province in China.

The species is listed as vulnerable.

Mahonia microphylla should not be confused with Berberis microphylla G.Forst., native to South America.

References

Endemic flora of China
Flora of Guangxi
Plants described in 1999
microphylla
Vulnerable plants
Taxonomy articles created by Polbot